Balázs Taróczy was the defending champion, but lost in the first round this year.

Björn Borg successfully defended his title, defeating Tomáš Šmíd 6–4, 6–3 in the final.

Seeds

  Björn Borg (champion)
  Víctor Pecci (second round)
  Balázs Taróczy (first round)
  Tomáš Šmíd (final)
  José Luis Damiani (quarterfinals)
  Ricardo Cano (quarterfinals)
  Heinz Günthardt (quarterfinals)
 N/A

Draw

Finals

Top half

Bottom half

External links
 ATP main draw

1981 in Swiss sport
1981 Grand Prix (tennis)
1981 Geneva Open